The 2001–02 Druga HNL was the 11th season of Druga HNL, the second level league in Croatian football. The format of the league changed from the previous three seasons and was contested in two regional groups (North Division and South Division), with 16 clubs each.

North Division

Clubs

League table

South Division

Clubs

In January 2002, Imotska Krajina and Imotski merged into a one club, where Imotski replaced Imotska Krajina in the second part of the Druga HNL season.

League table

See also
2001–02 Prva HNL
2001–02 Croatian Cup

References

External links
2001–02 in Croatian Football at Rec.Sport.Soccer Statistics Foundation
Official website  

First Football League (Croatia) seasons
Druga HNL
Cro